Senor Daredevil is a 1926 American silent Western film directed by Albert S. Rogell and starring Ken Maynard, Dorothy Devore and George Nichols.

Cast
 Ken Maynard as Don Luis O'Flaherty 
 Dorothy Devore as Sally Blake 
 George Nichols as 'Tiger' O'Flagherty 
 Josef Swickard as Juan Estrada 
 J.P. McGowan as Jesse Wilks 
 Sheldon Lewis as Ratburn 
 Buck Black as Pat Muldoon 
 Billy Franey as The Cook

References

Bibliography
 Munden, Kenneth White. The American Film Institute Catalog of Motion Pictures Produced in the United States, Part 1. University of California Press, 1997.

External links
 

1926 films
1926 Western (genre) films
Films directed by Albert S. Rogell
1920s English-language films
First National Pictures films
American black-and-white films
Silent American Western (genre) films
1920s American films